Alexander Langlitz (born 15 February 1991) is a German footballer who plays for Preußen Münster as a midfielder.

Career
Langlitz was born in Olgino in the Soviet Union. On 14 December 2011, he made his first senior appearance for the club as a substitute for José Manuel Jurado in a Europa League clash against Israeli Premier League team Maccabi Haifa which Schalke won 3–1. He signed for Rot-Weiss Essen in July 2013 and joined Sportfreunde Lotte a year later.

References

External links
 Alexander Langlitz at Footballdatabase
 

1991 births
Living people
Footballers from Saint Petersburg
German footballers
Association football forwards
FC Schalke 04 players
FC Schalke 04 II players
Rot-Weiss Essen players
Sportfreunde Lotte players
SC Preußen Münster players
3. Liga players